Jake Dodd (born 4 February 1995) is a Welsh boxer. He competes in the men's flyweight event category. He participated in the 2022 Commonwealth Games, being awarded the bronze medal.

References

1995 births
Living people
Welsh male boxers
Flyweight boxers
Boxers at the 2022 Commonwealth Games
Commonwealth Games bronze medallists for Wales
Commonwealth Games medallists in boxing
Medallists at the 2022 Commonwealth Games